Rustlers on Horseback is a 1950 American Western film directed by Fred C. Brannon and starring Allan Lane, Claudia Barrett and Eddy Waller. The film's art direction was by Frank Arrigo. The film released as a Fawcett Movie Comic#6 on October 23, 1950.

Plot

Cast
 Allan Lane as Marshal Rocky Lane  
 Black Jack as Black Jack  
 Eddy Waller as Nugget Clark 
 Roy Barcroft as Leo Straykin  
 Claudia Barrett as Carol Reynolds  
 John Eldredge as George Parradine  
 George Nader as Jack Reynolds 
 Forrest Taylor as Josh Taylor  
 John L. Cason as Henchman Murray 
 Stuart Randall as Jake Clune  
 Douglas Evans as Lawyer Ken Jordan 
 Tom Monroe as Guard Outside Hotel 
 George Lloyd as Postmaster  
 Marshall Reed as 2nd Floor Guard Bill

References

Bibliography
 Bernard A. Drew. Motion Picture Series and Sequels: A Reference Guide. Routledge, 2013.

External links
 

1950 films
1950 Western (genre) films
American Western (genre) films
Films directed by Fred C. Brannon
Republic Pictures films
Films adapted into comics
American black-and-white films
1950s English-language films
1950s American films